CPSO may refer to:

 Calcasieu Parish Sheriff's Office, Louisiana, United States, a police force 
 College of Physicians and Surgeons of Ontario, regulates doctors in Ontario, Canada 
 Communist Party of South Ossetia